Jøran André Smedal Kallmyr (born 15 April 1978) is a Norwegian politician and jurist for the Progress Party who served as Minister of Justice from 2019 to 2020.

Early life 
Kallmyr was born on 15 April 1978 in Fræna in Møre og Romsdal.

Career 
He served as State Secretary in the Ministry of Justice and Public Security from 2015 to 2016.

Minister of Justice
Kallmyr was appointed Minister of Justice and Immigration in Solberg's Cabinet from 29 March 2019, becoming the fifth Justice Minister in the Solberg Cabinet. 

He was succeeded by Monica Mæland as justice minister in January 2020 after his party had decided to withdraw from the cabinet over a dispute regarding a Muslim woman with a sick child being brought home from Syria. Kallmyr himself supported his party's decision to withdraw from the cabinet.

References

1978 births
Living people
People from Fræna
Politicians from Oslo
Norwegian state secretaries
Progress Party (Norway) politicians
Government ministers of Norway
Ministers of Justice of Norway